Sander Skogli (born 4 May 1993 in Sarpsborg, Norway) is a Norwegian ice hockey goaltender who plays for  Sparta Warriors. He has also made several appearances for the Norwegian national team at various youth levels.

Awards and achievements
Took the grand slam in the 2010/2011 season when he won with Sparta Warriors.
2010/2011 GET-ligaen Gold medal
2010/2011 The Norwegian Ice Hockey Championship Gold medal

References

https://web.archive.org/web/20120513034231/http://www.hockey.no/files/%7B3E28CEF0-F8BE-4B09-BE96-DC3E6F0AEE76%7D.pdf

External links

Sparta Warriors profile

1993 births
Living people
People from Sarpsborg
Norwegian ice hockey goaltenders
Sparta Warriors players
Sportspeople from Viken (county)